Claysburg may refer to:

 Claysburg, Pennsylvania, census-designated place in Pennsylvania, United States
 Claysburg, Ohio, extinct town in Ohio, United States

 Claysburg Air Force Station, closed United States Air Force General Surveillance Radar station

See also 
 Clay (disambiguation)
 Claysville (disambiguation)